Sri Balusu Prabhakara Pattabhirama Rao (30 December 1911 – 21 September 1988) was an Indian Telugu industrialist, politician, and the zamindar of Kapileswarpuram. He was a Minister in Composite Madras State, 1952–54, Andhra State during 1954–55. He was a Minister in Andhra Pradesh, 1956–60 and 1960–62. He was elected to 5th Lok Sabha,  6th Lok Sabha, 7th Lok Sabha, from the Rajahmundry Lok Sabha constituency.

Early life 
S. B. P. Pattabhurama Rao was born to Sri Balusu Butchi Sarvarayudu, the zamindar of the Kapileswarapuram Samsthanam in East Godavari District, and his wife S. B. Lakshmi Venkata Subbamma Rao on 30 December 1911. He was educated at  P.R. College, Kakinada, and Law College, Madras. He had a brother named S. B. P. B. K. Satyanarayana Rao who was a Union Minister of State for Agriculture in the Vajpayee government.

Life and career 
Pattabhurama Rao was a Member in Andhra Pradesh Legislative Assembly from 1952 to 1967, and of the Legislative Council from 1968 to 1970.

Rao was a Minister in Rajaji cabinate in Composite Madras State, (1952–53). He worked as  a Education Minister in T. Prakasam  cabinate  in  Andhra State during 1954–55. He was a Minister in  N. Sanjiva Reddy cabinate in Andhra Pradesh during1956-60 and Damodaram Sanjivayya cabinate during1960-62  as a Education andTransport Minister.

Rao worked as a Member of Fifth Lok Sabha, 1971–77, Sixth Lok Sabha, 1977–79 and Seventh Lok Sabha 1980- 1984. was a Union Minister of State in the Indira Gandhi government.

Rao was the recipient of an honorary D.Litt. from Andhra University and an honorary Dr. of Laws from Sri Venkateswara University.

Rao died in Madras on 21 September 1988, at the age of 76.

References 

1911 births
1988 deaths
Telugu politicians
India MPs 1971–1977
India MPs 1977–1979
India MPs 1980–1984
Members of the Andhra Pradesh Legislative Council
Andhra Pradesh MLAs 1962–1967
Lok Sabha members from Andhra Pradesh
Politicians from Rajahmundry